The Big Heat (城市特警) is a 1988 Hong Kong action film starring Waise Lee and Joey Wong.

Cast
 Waise Lee as Chief Inspector John Wong
 Joey Wong as Ada
 Matthew Wong as Inspector Kwok-Keung Lun
 Philip Kwok as Detective Ah Kam

Production
Johnnie To stated that "Tsui had lots of ideas [for The Big Heat], changing the script all the time, but three days later he would come up with something totally different." To went on to describe that the violence in the film originated from Hark's suggestions, and that it was "a very difficult project" To noted that he was brought in after another director was unable to satisfy Tsui Hark. To also stated that he did not complete the film, but that Tsui Hark completed it with Ching Siu-tung shooting some scenes.

Release
The Big Heat was released in Hong Kong on 22 September 1988. It was described by Lisa Morton as a "minor box office disappointment", grossing HK$4.076 million and being the 94th highest-grossing film in Hong Kong in 1988.

Reception
Johnnie To reflected on the film in the late 1990s, stating that "it's good at places, but it was chaotic".

References

Sources

External links
 
 
 Hong Kong Cinemagic entry

1988 films
1988 action films
Hong Kong action films
Gun fu films
Police detective films
1980s Cantonese-language films
Films directed by Johnnie To
Films set in Hong Kong
Films shot in Hong Kong
1980s Hong Kong films